Negel is a village in Lumar Rural District, Central District, Sirvan County, Ilam Province, Iran. At the 2006 census, its population was 212, in 38 families. The village is populated by Kurds.

References 

Populated places in Sirvan County
Kurdish settlements in Ilam Province